The 1926 Campeonato Carioca, the 21st edition of that championship, kicked off on April 4, 1926 and ended on November 21, 1926. It was organized by AMEA (Associação Metropolitana de Esportes Atléticos, or Metropolitan Athletic Sports Association). Ten teams participated. São Cristóvão won the title for the 1st time. No teams were relegated.

Participating teams 

Originally, there would be no promotion and relegation within the league, even though there was a Second level, but at the end of the 1925 season, Hellênico left the league. To fill the remaining berth in the first level, the winners and runners-up of 1925's Second level, Andarahy and Villa Isabel, respectively, applied, with Villa Isabel being chosen.

System 
The tournament would be disputed in a double round-robin format, with the team with the most points winning the title.

Championship

References 

Campeonato Carioca seasons
Carioca